First Lieutenant Albert E. Fernald (May 13, 1838 – December 3, 1908) was an American soldier who fought in the American Civil War. Fernald received the country's highest award for bravery during combat, the Medal of Honor, for his action during the Battle of Five Forks in Virginia on 1 April 1865. He was honored with the award on 10 May 1865.

Biography
Fernald was born in Winterport, Maine, on 13 May 1838. He enlisted into the 20th Maine Infantry. He died on 3 December 1908 and his remains are interred at the Oak Hill Cemetery in Maine.

Medal of Honor citation

See also

List of American Civil War Medal of Honor recipients: A–F

References

1838 births
1908 deaths
People of Maine in the American Civil War
Union Army officers
United States Army Medal of Honor recipients
American Civil War recipients of the Medal of Honor
People from Winterport, Maine